Cerro Machín is a stratovolcano located in Tolima Department, Colombia. Cerro Machin is a volcanic plug that is approximately the same age (1,000,000+ years) as the Ruiz-Tolima Massif and has the appearance of being part of that volcanic system. Its sisters are Nevado del Tolima, ; Santa Isabel, Nevado del Ruiz, plus nine other lesser volcanoes and a  volcanic South Wall containing in excess of thirty volcanic domes.

Gallery

See also 
 List of volcanoes in Colombia
 List of volcanoes by elevation

References 

Andean Volcanic Belt
Mountains of Colombia
Stratovolcanoes of Colombia
Quaternary South America
Quaternary volcanoes
Geography of Tolima Department